Boho may refer to:

Geography
 Boho, County Fermanagh, a village and parish in County Fermanagh, Northern Ireland
 Boho Caves, a cave system in Boho
 Boho, North Sumatra, a village on the island of Samosir, Indonesia

Other uses
 Boho, short for "Bohemian", see Bohemianism
 BoHo Theatre, the Bohemian Theatre Ensemble based in Chicago, Illinois
 Jade Boho (born 1986), Spanish-born Equatorial Guinean footballer

See also
 Boho-chic, a fashion style of the early 21st century